Vara Vikrayam is a famous novel and play with same name by Kallakoori Narayana Rao. It is based on a reformist social theme about the Dowry system prevalent in India.

Main characters
 Purushotham Rao, Revenue inspector
 Kalindi, elder daughter of Purushotham Rao
 Kamala, younger daughter of Purushotham Rao
 Singaraju Lingaraju
 Basavaraju, adopted son of Singaraju Lingaraju
 Vengalappa
 Veerayya

The plot
Purshottama Rao is a retired government official. He has two daughters. He borrows money to get his elder daughter Kalindi married to an greedy money lender Lingaraju's educated son. Kalindi does not like this marriage and commits suicide before the marriage. Lingaraju refuses to return the dowry money. Purshottama's second daughter Kamala agrees to marry him. She drags her father-in-law Lingaraju to court of justice.

The film Subhalekha directed by K.Viswanath has similarities with this film.

Publications
It is published for the first time in 1921. Kondapalli Veeravenkaiah and Sons, Rajahmundry published the play in 1947. It has been published in 1993 by Jayanthi Publishers, Vijayawada.

The 1939 film

Vara Vikrayam was made in 1939 as a Telugu film directed by Chittajallu Pullayya starring Bhanumathi Ramakrishna. Balijepalli Lakshmikantham portrayed the key role of Singaraju Lingaraju.

References

External links
 Listen to Vara Vikrayam dialogues at Andhra Natakam.com

Indian plays
Indian plays adapted into films
Telugu-language plays